Ogre You Asshole is a Japanese rock band formed in Nagano, taking influences from Modest Mouse, Fugazi, Talking Heads, and Can. They were signed to major label VAP in 2009 and have been praised by the notable guitarist Johnny Marr.

History
Manabu and his elder brother covered Nirvana and Beck songs with original drummer Arata Nishi in the nineties under the name "Joy Division". Manabu's brother left, but he was joined by childhood friend Norihito Hiraide and highschool classmate Kei Mabuchi. Nishi then left due to health reasons and was replaced by Takashi Katsuura. They produced their first demo in 2004 and went on to support many notable domestic and international bands including Asian Kung-Fu Generation, Foo Fighters, Art School, The Dresden Dolls and their biggest influence Modest Mouse.

When asked what he attributes their success to, Manabu answered, "I'm not sure. I guess it is because of our name". However, notable fan Johnny Marr said in an interview "I would love to play with Ogre You Asshole. I love 'em. They're not afraid to be poppy. Some guitar bands just don't have the nerve to be poppy and second-guess themselves, you know".

The band was signed to major label VAP in 2009 after releasing their previous work on their independent label OYA. Their major debut single 'Pinhole' was also featured on Nano-Mugen Compilation 2009 and as an ending theme to the anime Sōten Kōro. Their first album on the label 'Foglamp' also included a DVD with the music videos of 'Pinhole' and 'Headlight'.

Origin of name
The name originated when original drummer Arata Nishi saw Modest Mouse bassist Eric Judy on the street near the Hot Lab live house after a gig in Matsumoto during their Japan tour in May 2001. He asked Judy, who was drunk, to name their band. He replied 'I can't' before writing 'Ogre You Asshole' on Nishi's arm.

They were unaware of the exact meaning until American Analog Set told them that the name is actually from a line in the movie Revenge of the Nerds. This resulted in the group setting out to watch the 1984 American comedy and its three sequels, who then paid homage to it with their second album 'AlphaBeta vs. Lambda'.

They shared the tale with Judy in April 2008 when they opened Modest Mouse's show at Tokyo's Duo Music Exchange, but he had no recollection of the encounter.

Current members
 – vocals, guitar
 – guitar
 – drums
 – bass

Former members
 – drums
The original drummer of the group, who left for medical reasons, now provides artwork for their CD covers.
 – bass

Discography

Albums

Ogre You Asshole
Ogre You Asshole is the first full-length studio album by Ogre You Asshole. It was released independently on December 7, 2005. Tracks 4 and 7 are taken from their first demo, while track 3 was released before the album as a single.

Track listing

J.N

EPs

 1st Demo
 Heikin wa Sayuu Gyaku no Kitai
 Shiranai Aizu Shiraseru Ko
  – released September 1, 2010.

Ukareteiru hito's track listing:

 Ukareteiru hito twilight edition
 dope

Singles
 Tanishi
 Pinhole – a song released as a single on March 4, 2009. It was their debut release for a major label after they signed with VAP. The song was included on Asian Kung-Fu Generation's Nano-Mugen Compilation 2009 and was used as the ending theme for the anime Sōten Kōro.

Pinhole's track listing:

References

External links
 Official Website
 VAP site
 Myspace

Japanese alternative rock groups
Japanese rock music groups
Japanese indie rock groups
Musical groups from Nagano Prefecture